A raygun is a  (primarily science-fiction) weapon, delivering to a target a beam of  destructive particles or radiant energy, and generally featuring very slow diverging of the (destructive-energy density of the beam,  due to any  lateral spreading as distance from the weapon increases.

Raygun also may refer to:
Raygun (band), a British band
Raygun (album), a 1996 album by the Matthew Good Band
Ray Gun (magazine), a music magazine published during the 1990s
Ray Gun Suitcase, an album by Pere Ubu
Plastic Raygun, a successful independent record label in the UK

See also
Reagan (disambiguation)